{|

  
{{Infobox ship career
| Hide header =title
| Ship country = United Kingdom
| Ship flag =
| Ship name = HMS Perim
| Ship namesake = Perim
| Ship acquired =16 March 1944
| Ship commissioned = 16 March 1944
| Ship decommissioned =1945<ref name="decommissioning">According to uboat.net HMS Perim (K 593), Perim' is not listed as an active unit on the October 1945 Navy List, strongly implying that the Royal Navy decommissioned her sometime earlier that year.</ref>
| Ship in service = 
| Ship out of service = 
| Ship struck = 
| Ship reinstated = 
| Ship honours = 
| Ship identification = Pennant number: K593 
| Ship fate = Returned to United States 22 May 1946, Scrapped 1947
| Ship notes = 
}}

|}
She originally was ordered by the United States Navy as the Tacoma-class patrol frigate USS Phillimore (PF-89) and was transferred to the Royal Navy prior to completion.

Construction and acquisition
The ship, originally designated a "patrol gunboat," PG-197, was ordered by the United States Maritime Commission under a United States Navy contract as USS Phillimore. She was reclassified as a "patrol frigate," PF-89, on 15 April 1943 and laid down by the Walsh-Kaiser Company at Providence, Rhode Island, on 7 October 1943. Intended for transfer to the United Kingdom, the ship was first renamed Sierra Leone and then Perim by the British prior to launching and was launched on 5 November 1943.

Service history
Transferred to the United Kingdom under Lend-Lease on 16 March 1944, the ship served in the Royal Navy as HMS Perim (K593). Her first commanding officer was Nicholas Monsarrat. Conducting work-ups off Bermuda, she damaged her main bearings during each of her first 13 sea trials before the problem was identified and corrected and she completed trials successfully on her fourteenth try. She then served on patrol and escort duty until decommissioned in 1945.

Disposal
The United Kingdom returned Perim'' to the U.S. Navy on 22 May 1946. She was scrapped in 1947.

References

Notes

Bibliography
  Frigate Photo Archive HMS Perim (K 593) ex-Phillimore ex-PF-89 ex-PG-197 Navsource Online:
British Escort Movements WW2 - Colony-class frigates naval-history.net

1943 ships
Ships built in Providence, Rhode Island
Tacoma-class frigates
Colony-class frigates
World War II frigates and destroyer escorts of the United States
World War II frigates of the United Kingdom